Sebastián Adolfo Ereros (born 14 April 1985, in Caseros) is an Argentine football forward currently playing for Talleres de Córdoba in the Torneo Federal A in Argentina.

Career
Ereros started his career in 2005 with Vélez Sársfield. In 2006, he was joint topscorer in the Copa Libertadores 2006 with 5 goals. He scored 6 goals in 26 games in all competitions for Velez.

In 2007 Ereros joined newly promoted Tigre on loan. The Apertura 2007 was Tigre's first season in the Primera since 1980, Ereros was a member of the first team, playing in 13 of Tigre's 19 games and scoring 2 goals. The club finished in 2nd place which was the highest league finish in their history.

On 17 August 2009 he was loaned to Gimnasia de La Plata. On 8 January 2010, Cerro Porteño signed the Argentine forward on loan from Vélez Sársfield.

In July 2010, Ereros joined recently promoted All Boys to play the 2010-11 Argentine Primera División season.

Since season 2013, he plays for Instituto de Córdoba.

Honours
Individual
Copa Libertadores joint top scorer: 2006

References

External links
 Football-Lineups player profile
 Argentine Primera statistics at Futbol XXI

1985 births
Living people
Sportspeople from Buenos Aires Province
Argentine footballers
Argentine expatriate footballers
Association football forwards
Club Atlético Vélez Sarsfield footballers
Club Atlético Tigre footballers
Club de Gimnasia y Esgrima La Plata footballers
Cerro Porteño players
Asteras Tripolis F.C. players
All Boys footballers
Quilmes Atlético Club footballers
Chacarita Juniors footballers
AS Trenčín players
2. Liga (Slovakia) players
Deportes Iquique footballers
Chilean Primera División players
Argentine Primera División players
Super League Greece players
Expatriate footballers in Greece
Expatriate footballers in Slovakia
Expatriate footballers in Chile
Expatriate footballers in Paraguay
Argentine expatriate sportspeople in Greece
Argentine expatriate sportspeople in Slovakia
Argentine expatriate sportspeople in Chile
Argentine expatriate sportspeople in Paraguay